Chinese law is one of the oldest legal traditions in the world. The core of modern Chinese law is based on Germanic-style civil law, socialist law, and traditional Chinese approaches.

For most of the history of China, its legal system has been based on the Confucian philosophy of social control through moral education, as well as the Legalist emphasis on codified law and criminal sanction. Following the Xinhai Revolution, the Republic of China adopted a largely Western-style legal code in the civil law tradition (specifically German- and Swiss-based). The establishment of the People's Republic of China in 1949 brought with it a more Soviet-influenced system of socialist law. However, earlier traditions from Chinese history have retained their influence.

Chinese legal tradition 

The word for law in classical Chinese was fǎ (法). The Chinese character for fǎ denotes a meaning of "fair", "straight" and "just", derived from its water radical (氵). It also carries the sense of "standard, measurement, and model". Derk Bodde and Clarence Morris held that the concept of fǎ had an association with yì (義: "social rightness"). Yan Fu, in his Chinese translation of Montesquieu's De l'esprit des lois published in 1913, warned his readers about the difference between the Chinese fǎ and Western law: "The word 'law' in Western languages has four different interpretations in Chinese as in lǐ (理: "order"), lǐ (禮: "rites", "decorum"), fǎ (法: "human laws") and zhì (制: "control").

A term which preceded fǎ was xíng (刑), which originally probably referred to decapitation. Xíng later evolved to be a general term for laws that related to criminal punishment. The early history Shang Shu recorded the earliest forms of the "five penalties": tattooing, disfigurement, castration, mutilation, and death. Once written law came into existence, the meaning of xíng was extended to include not only punishments but also any state prohibitions whose violation would result in punishments. In modern times, xíng denotes penal law or criminal law. An example of the classical use of xíng is Xíng Bù (刑部, lit. "Department of Punishment") for the legal or justice department in imperial China.

The two major Chinese philosophical schools discussed below, Confucianism and Legalism, strongly influenced the idea of law in China. Briefly, under Confucianism, the state should lead the people with virtue and thus create a sense of shame which will prevent bad conduct. Under Legalism, law is to be publicly promulgated standards of conduct backed by state coercion. The tension between these two systems is that Confucianism relies on tradition to make the leader the head of household of all China, while Legalism makes standard law that even the emperor should be bound by. The common factor is that both endorse to different degrees a paternalistic conception of the state, which knows better than its citizens and makes laws to protect them. This concept persisted throughout the imperial period, into the republican period, and can still be seen acting today.

Unlike many other major civilizations where written law was held in honor and often attributed to divine origin, law in early China was viewed in purely secular terms, and its initial appearance was greeted with hostility by Confucian thinkers as indicative of a serious moral decline, a violation of human morality, and even a disturbance of the total cosmic order. Historically, the people's awareness and acceptance of ethical norms was shaped far more by the pervasive influence of custom and usage of property and by inculcating moral precepts than by any formally enacted system of law. Early emperors however embraced the Legalist ideal as a way of exerting control over their large and growing territory and population. This process was integrated with traditional Chinese beliefs in the cosmic order, holding that correct behavior was behavior consonant with the appropriate responses set by fǎ. Xíng states the potential costs to the individual of exceeding them and imposes penalties for these actions.

The imperial period was characterized mainly by the concept of law as serving the state, a means of exerting control over the citizenry. In the late Qing dynasty there were efforts to reform the law codes mainly by importing German codes with slight modifications. This effort continued and was amplified in the republican period resulting in the Provisional Constitution of 1912 which included the idea of equality under the law, rights for women, and broader rights for citizens vis-à-vis the government. The onset of the communist period at first rolled back the development of individual rights with the primary concept of law returning to that of a tool of the state. After the Cultural Revolution devastated the ranks of intellectuals and legal professionals, it took until 1982 for the idea of individual rights to reemerge as a significant influence on Chinese law.

The current constitution, created in 1982, states in Article V that no organization or individual is above the law and in Article III makes the People’s Congresses and state administration responsible to the people, paving the way for later efforts to allow enforcement of individual rights. Passage of the Administrative Litigation Law of 1987 created legal recourse for individuals from arbitrary government action, an avenue previously unavailable. Despite the deep-seated norm against legal proceedings, litigation in the Chinese courts has increased dramatically, especially in recent years. The continuing weakness of courts resulting from their dependence on the local government for financial support and enforcement undermines the effectiveness of these remedies but this has also begun to change with China’s initiatives to increase legal training and the professionalism of the judiciary.

One avenue of individual appeal from government action which continues to be important is the custom of xìnfǎng 信访 (or shàngfǎng 上访) or petitions by citizens to the individuals officials for change. The continuing wide use of xìnfǎng reflects the fact that many officials are still able to avoid legal sanctions and the underlying avoidance of the legal system, as well as the personal ability of officials to personally intervene to change unjust results. Recently xìnfǎng has been institutionalized to some extent with the central government mandating that every level of administration establish a xìnfǎng office to handle petitions and report them up to high levels. This solution by exertion of personal power clearly goes against the idea of rule of law, and worse, some scholars have noted that xìnfǎng today functions more as an informational collection system for the government than an effective review mechanism.

Confucianism and Legalism 
Confucianism and Legalism are two major Classical legal theories or philosophies developed during the Spring and Autumn period and the Warring States period, a time that saw the most impressive proliferation of new ideas and philosophies in Chinese history. While both theories call for governmental hierarchy, they differ drastically in their views of human potential and the preferred means to achieve political order. Nevertheless, both theories have influenced and continue to influence the development of cultural, social, and legal norms in China.

Confucianism 
The basic premise of Confucianism is the idea that human beings are fundamentally good. With this optimistic view on human potential, Confucius advocates for ruling through li – traditional customs, mores, and norms – which allow people to have a sense of shame and become humane people with good character, rather than through government regulations and penal law. The idea is that people will internalize the acceptable norms and only take proper actions. This will not only lead to a harmonious social order, but it will also provide the additional benefit of improving an individual’s inner character and the overall quality of the society. In contrast, codified laws require external compliance, and people may abide by the laws without fully understanding the reason for compliance. As such, a social order achieved through formal laws does not come with the additional benefit of better citizenry. It is worth noting, however, that even Confucius did not advocate for the elimination of formal laws. Rather, according to Confucius, laws should be used minimally and reserved only for those that insist on pursuing one’s self-interests without taking into account the well-being of the society.

As Confucius rejects the general use of formal laws to achieve social order, what lies vital to Confucius’ theory is the willing participation by citizens of the society to search for commonly accepted, cooperative solutions. In addition to willing participation of citizens, there must also be grounds or bases upon which commonly acceptable solutions can be arrived at – the concept known as li. Li is commonly understood as a set of culturally and socially valued norms that provide guidance to proper behaviors that will ultimately lead to a harmonious society. These norms are not fixed or unchangeable over time but rather a reflection of what is accepted at a particular time in a particular context. When conflicts arise, the li have to be applied and interpreted to produce a just result and restore the harmony of the society. However, in the absence of any procedural safeguard afforded by codified laws, interpretation of li is subject to abuse.

Recognizing that people in a society hold diverse interests, Confucius charges the ruler with the responsibility to unify these interests and maintain social order. This is not done by dictatorship but by setting an example. Therefore, a ruler needs not to force his people to behave properly. Instead, the ruler needs only to make himself respectful, and the people will be induced and enlightened by his superior virtues to follow his example – an ideal known as wúwéi. Nevertheless, the ruler must know and understand the li to be able to create solutions to conflict and problems the society faces. As the people are to follow the moral standards and example set by the ruler, to a large extent, the quality of the ruler determines the quality of the political order.

Legalism 
In contrast to Confucius’ li-based theory, the Legalism advocates the utilization of codified laws and harsh punishment to achieve social order. This is due to the legalists’ belief that all human beings are born evil and self-interested. Therefore, if left unrestrained, people would engage in selfish behavior which will undoubtedly lead to social unrest. To cure this defect and force people to behave morally, the only way, believed the legalists, is to publicly promulgate clearly written laws and impose harsh punishments.

Realizing that the abilities of rulers are often limited and that reliance on the ruler’s ability and judgment often leads to adverse results, the legalists designed a system in which the law is run by the state, not the ruler. This ensures that the laws will be applied impartially without the interference of personal bias of the ruler or ones who are responsible for applying the laws. It also makes it irrelevant whether the ruler has superior abilities. This non-action promoted by the legalists is their understanding of the concept of wuwei, which is different from the Confucians’ understanding of the same concept.

Comparison 
Notwithstanding such an understanding, the ruler, like in Confucianism, has the ultimate authority to decide what the law should be. Therefore, like Confucianism, Legalism is subject to abuse as well. In fact, the Qin emperor implemented strict laws and extremely harsh punishments without taking into account mitigating circumstances even for insignificant crimes. For example, books were burned and people holding different ideals were buried alive. While the Qin emperor successfully instilled fear and respect for law into the minds of his people, the harshness of the law led to his quick demise after only 14 years of reigning over China.

In summary, although both Confucianism and Legalism were developed in a period of turmoil and both were aimed at the re-unification of the country, the two theories went opposite directions with one advocating for and one against the use of formal laws to achieve social order. What the two theories have in common is their concession of the ultimate authority to the ruler, who remained above and beyond the li or law. It is true that neither theory is ideal in achieving a social order. Nevertheless, both theories have had a significant impact on the cultural and legal development in China, and their influence remains visible today.

The significant influence of the Legalist tradition in Chinese law has historically been overlooked. Although the Confucian ideology provided the fundamentals for the substance of traditional law, the Legalist school constructed the important framework of the traditional legal system. The Han dynasty retained the basic legal system established under the Qin but modified some of the harsher aspects in line with the Confucian philosophy of social control.

The Han dynasty formally recognized four sources of law: lü (律: "codified laws"), ling (令: "the emperor's order"), ke (科: "statutes inherited from previous dynasties") and bi (比: "precedents"), among which ling has the highest binding power over the other three. Most legal professionals were not lawyers but generalists trained in philosophy and literature. The local, classically trained, Confucian gentry played a crucial role as arbiters and handled all but the most serious local disputes.

Eventually, the incorporation of the essentials of Confucianist li into legal codes occurred with this Confucian conception dominating ancient Chinese law. Ch'ü concludes that the gradual process of Confucianisation of law was the most significant development in the legal system of China prior to 20th century modernization. The line between ruling by moral influence and ruling by punishment was not always clearly delineated. For example, li could be enforced by moral influence and legal means. The metamorphosis of li into law depended on its widespread and unvaried acceptance by society.

Although the codification of law was largely completed by the Tang Code of CE 624, throughout the centuries the Confucian foundations of the Tang Code were retained, and indeed with some aspects of it strengthened by the later dynasties. The Great Ming Code, which was a model for the Qing code, covered every part of social and political life, especially family and ritual, but also foreign relations and even relations of earthly life with the cosmos. 

The Confucian notion that morality and self-discipline was more important than legal codes caused many historians, such as Max Weber, until the mid-20th century to conclude that law was not an important part of Imperial Chinese society. This notion, however, has come under extreme criticism and is no longer the conventional wisdom among Sinologists, who have concluded that Imperial China had an elaborate system of both criminal and civil law which was comparable to anything found in Europe.

During the Qing dynasty, criminal justice was based on extremely detailed Great Qing Legal Code. One element of the traditional Chinese criminal justice system is the notion that criminal law has a moral purpose, one of which is to get the convicted to repent and see the error of his ways. In the traditional Chinese legal system, a person could not be convicted of a crime unless he has confessed. This often led to the use of torture, in order to extract the necessary confession. These elements still influence modern Chinese views toward law. All capital offenses were reported to the capital and required the personal approval of the emperor.

There was no civil code separate from the criminal code, which led to the now discredited belief that traditional Chinese law had no civil law. More recent studies have demonstrated that most of the magistrates' legal work was in civil disputes, and that there was an elaborate system of civil law which used the criminal code to establish torts.

Modernization 
The introduction and translation of Western legal texts into Chinese is believed to have been started under the auspices of Lin Zexu in 1839. More systematic introduction of Western law together with other Western sciences started with the establishment of Tongwen Guan in 1862. The major efforts in translation of Western law that continued until the 1920s prepared the building blocks for modern Chinese legal language and Chinese law. Legal translation was very important from 1896 to 1936 during which period the Chinese absorbed and codified their version of Western laws. These efforts were assisted by the medium of the Japanese legal language and law developed in Japan during the Meiji period which involved in large part Japanese translation of European Continental laws.

In the late Qing dynasty there was a concerted effort to establish legal codes based on European models. Because of the German victory in the Franco-Prussian War and because Japan was used as the model for political and legal reform, the law codes which were adopted were modeled closely after that of Germany.

Attitudes toward the traditional Chinese legal system changed markedly in the late-20th century. Most Chinese and Westerners of the early 20th century regarded the traditional Chinese legal system as backward and barbaric. However, extensive research into China's traditional legal system has caused attitudes to become more favorable in the late-20th and early 21st centuries. Researchers of the early and mid-20th century tended to compare the traditional Chinese legal system to then contemporary systems, finding the former to be backward. However, more recent research compared the 18th-century Chinese legal system to European systems of the 18th century, resulting in a far more positive view of traditional Chinese law. 

The Department of Punishment was changed to fa bu (法部: "Department of Law") in the early 1900s legal reforms.

Republic of China 

Law in the Republic of China (Taiwan) is mainly a civil law system. The legal structure is codified into the Six Codes: the Constitution, the Civil Code, the Code of Civil Procedures, the Criminal Code, the Code of Criminal Procedures and in Administrative Laws.

People's Republic of China 

After the Communist victory in 1949, the newly established People's Republic of China (PRC) quickly abolished the ROC's legal codes and attempted to create a system of socialist law copied from the Soviet Union. With the Sino-Soviet split (1960-1989) and the Cultural Revolution (1966-1976), all legal work came under suspicion of being counter-revolutionary, and the legal system completely collapsed. A new concept of justice called judicial populism (sifa dazhonghua) was established. Instead of the requirement for judges to comply with strict judicial procedures, it promoted substantive justice and problem-solving mechanisms. This legal tradition is based on a cultural view of the non-finality in justice as well as the revolutionary practice of the Communist Party that relies on people's justice.

Over the past century China has had several constitutions. The first attempts towards implementing a constitution in China occurred during the final decade (1902-1912) of the Qing dynasty. Various controlling groups subsequently promulgated different constitutions between that time and the establishment of the PRC in 1949. The PRC had a provisional constitution from its inception until the enactment of its first constitution in 1954. This initial constitution was based on the constitution of the Soviet Union. It was shortly ignored, however, and became without legal force. Although it provided for the election of the National People’s Congress (NPC) every four years as the highest state power, these guidelines were not adhered to. The second constitution of the PRC, modeled on the ideology of the Cultural Revolution, came into force in 1975. This constitution subjected the NPC to the Chinese Communist Party ("CCP") and removed previous constitutional protections such as equality under the law and private-property succession rights. It was also immediately disregarded through breaches of its provisions and non-adherence to guidelines regarding the NPC. The third constitution of the PRC was adopted in 1978. Although this version moved away from the ideologies of the Cultural Revolution, it did retain some remnants of it. It also retained Communist Party control over the state structure. However, reformists subsequently gained power, which led to the breakdown of this constitution as focus shifted to economic construction and modernization.

With the start of the Deng Xiaoping reforms, the idea of reconstructing a legal system to restrain abuses of official authority and developing a "rule of law" to replace rule by dictatorship began to gain traction. New laws were passed and foreign investors sought improvements in property rights which had not been a feature of Maoist government but there was internal conflict in China over the extent of incorporating foreign legal norms into the Chinese legal system. Chinese reformers sought to create a special arbitration body, independent of the local legal system, called the China International Economic Trade and Arbitration Commission (CIETAC). In 1982 Peng Zhen said "It is necessary to draw on beneficial experiences—ancient of modern, Chinese or foreign—in studying the science of law...We study them in order to make the past serve the present and foreign things serve China". Others who were more supportive of reforms like Qiao Shi still urged cauto against "just copying blindly" and Deng Xiaoping himself said "we must pay attention to studying and absorbing foreign experience...However, we will never succeed if we mechanically copy the experiences and models of other countries".

In 1982 the National People's Congress adopted a new state constitution that emphasized the rule of law under which even party leaders are theoretically held accountable. Legal reconstruction occurred in piece-meal fashion. Typically, temporary or local regulations would be established; after a few years of experimentation, conflicting regulations and laws would be standardized.

The  Constitution of the PRC, enacted in 1982, reflects the model of the first PRC constitution. The Constitution provides for leadership through the working class, led in turn by the Communist Party. This Constitution also contains more extensive rights than any of the previous constitutions. The rights include equality before the law, political rights, religious freedom, personal freedom, social and economic rights, cultural and educational rights, and familial rights. These rights, however, are connected to social duties. The duties include safeguarding the unity, security, honor, and interests of the country, observing law and social ethics, paying taxes, and serving in the military. Neither the rights nor duties provided for in the Constitution are exhaustive.

The Constitution provides that the NPC is the supreme organ of state power over a structure of other people's congresses at various levels. The NPC has power to:

 amend the Constitution by a two-thirds majority
 promulgate legislation
 elect and remove highest-level officials
 determine the budget
 control economic and social-development planning

The NPC also includes a Standing Committee that functions much as the NPC does when the NPC is not in session. Although the Standing Committee has had some powers since 1955, its law-making powers were initially provided for in the 1982 Constitution. The NPC sits at the highest level in the hierarchy of governmental structure in the PRC. This national level is followed in descending order by the provincial level (including autonomous regions and municipalities directly under the national level), the prefectural level, the county level, and the townships and towns level. Government members at the lower two levels are directly elected, and those at the higher levels are elected by the lower levels. In addition to the NPC, the provincial people's congresses possesses legislative power and can pass laws so long as they do not contravene the Constitution or higher legislation or administrative regulations.

The Constitution states its own supremacy. However, it has been theorized that the supremacy of the Communist Party means that the Constitution and law are not supreme, and that this perspective results from the Marxist view of law as simply a superstructure combined with a lack of recognition of rule of law in philosophical or historical tradition. Although the Constitution provides for legislative, executive, judicial, and procuratorial powers, they all remain subject to Communist Party leadership. Often, important political decisions are made through actions which are not regulated by the Constitution. Additionally, courts need not rely on the Constitution in deciding cases, and they may not review legislation for Constitutionality. Nonetheless, the Constitution does provide the linguistic framework for conducting government affairs and describing them in the media.

Since 1979, when the drive to establish a functioning legal system began, more than 300 laws and regulations, most of them in the economic area, have been promulgated. The use of mediation committees, informed groups of citizens who resolve about 90% of the PRC's civil disputes and some minor criminal cases at no cost to the parties, is one innovative device. More than 800,000 such committees operate - in both rural and urban areas.

In drafting the new laws, the PRC has not copied any other legal system wholesale, and the general pattern has involved issuing laws for a specific topic or location. Often laws are drafted on a trial basis, with the law being redrafted after several years. This process of creating a legal infrastructure piecemeal has led to many situations where the laws are missing, confusing, or contradictory, and has led to judicial decisions having more precedental value than in most civil law jurisdictions. In formulating laws, the PRC has been influenced by a number of sources, including traditional Chinese views toward the role of law, the PRC's socialist background, the German-based law of the Republic of China on Taiwan, and the English-based common law used in Hong Kong.

Legal reform became a government priority in the 1990s. The Chinese government has promoted a reform it often calls "legalisation" (法制化). Legalisation, among other things, has provided the régime with a gloss of legitimacy and has enhanced predictability. There have been major efforts in the rationalization and strengthening of the legal structure and institution building in terms of developing and improving the professionalism of the legislature, judiciary and legal profession. As market reforms have deepened and social inequality has widened, legal forums – ranging from mediation and arbitration commissions to courts – have come to play an increasingly prominent role.

The 1994 Administrative Procedural Law allows citizens to sue officials for abuse of authority or malfeasance. In addition, the criminal law and the criminal-procedures laws were amended to introduce significant reforms. The criminal-law amendments abolished the crime of "counter-revolutionary" activity. However political dissidents are sometimes charged on the grounds of subverting state security or of publishing state secrets. Criminal-procedures reforms also encouraged establishment of a more transparent, adversarial trial process. Minor crimes such as prostitution and drug use are sometimes dealt with under re-education through labor laws. The PRC constitution and laws provide for fundamental human rights, including due process, but some have argued that they are often ignored in practice. (See Human rights in the People's Republic of China.)

The basic principles of Chinese legislative drafting include generality and flexibility. Sometimes excessive generality and omissions in Chinese law, coupled with the wide discretionary powers conferred on local authorities to implement laws, undermines the predictability and certainty of law. Furthermore, as Chinese law is intended to be educative, the language of the law is that of the ordinary language comprehensible to the average citizen, although in reality many laws are drafted in broad and indeterminate language.

As a result of a pending trade war with the United States of America over violations of intellectual property rights of American corporations in the early 1990s, the People's Republic of China's trademark law has been modified and  offers significant protections to foreign trademark-owners.

After their respective transfers of sovereignty, Hong Kong and Macau continue to practice English Common Law and Portuguese legal systems respectively, with their own courts of final appeal. In other words, Hong Kong and Macau lie outside of the legal jurisdiction of the People's Republic of China, except on constitutional issues.

Due to the growing sophistication of Chinese laws, the expansion of the rule of law, as well as an influx of foreign law firms, China has also begun to develop a legal-services market. Foreign lawyers have accompanied foreign capital and their clients to China, which has had an immense influence on the promulgation of new Chinese laws based on international norms, especially in regards to intellectual property and corporate and securities law.

On July 1, 1992, in order to meet growing demand, the Chinese government opened the legal-services market to foreign law-firms, allowing them to establish offices in China when the Ministry of Justice and the State Administration of Industry and Commerce (SAOIC) issued the Provisional Regulation of Establishment of Offices by Foreign Law Firms regulation.

As a result, many foreign law firms, including the United States' Baker & McKenzie and Paul, Weiss, Rifkind, Wharton & Garrison, along with several British firms, incorporated consulting firms in their home countries or in Hong Kong and then set up subsidiaries in Beijing or Shanghai to provide legal services.

However, many regulatory barriers to entry remain to protect the domestic legal industry. Issues relating to Chinese law must be referred to Chinese law firms, and foreign lawyers are also prohibited from interpreting or practicing Chinese law or from representing their clients in court. However, in reality many foreign law firms interpret laws and manage litigation by directing the local firms they must have cooperative relationships with. In this regard, China's restrictive legal market can be directly tied to a phobia of people asserting their legal rights in the face of rampant corruption. Information received from the State Council Legislative Office suggests that China may be allowing foreigners to sit the Chinese Lawyers Examination, or have a mutual recognition treaty with other countries to allow foreign lawyers to conduct non-litigation Chinese legal work.

While China's legal market continues to open up, China's laws and regulations have helped the development of a number of domestic Chinese firms specializing in working with foreigners to meet the demand of a booming economy. According to Asia Law and Business magazine China Awards, the top China firms were King & Wood PRC Lawyers, Commerce & Finance Law Offices, Fangda Partners, Haiwen & Partners, Jun He Law Offices and Lehman, Lee & Xu.

In 2005, China started implementing legal reform, which revived the Maoist-era ideals adopted during the 1950s due to the position that the law is cold and unresponsive to the needs of its citizens. This initiative favored mediation over court trials when it came to resolving conflicts among citizens and conflicts between citizens and the state. It also revived judicial populism at the expense of judicial professionalism and was marked by the return of the mass-trial model used during the 1940s.

Legal rights 
The modern idea of legal rights was introduced to China from the West in the 19th century. Its translation as quánlì (权利) was coined by William Alexander Parsons Martin in 1864, in his translation of Henry Wheaton's Elements of International Law.

Rule of law 
One of the most commonly used phrases in contemporary China, by legal scholars and politicians alike, is fǎzhì (法治). Fǎzhì can be translated into English as "rule of law", but questions have often been asked whether Chinese leaders meant "rule by law", which means the instrumental use of laws by rulers to facilitate social control and to impose punishment as understood in the Legalist tradition. The related concepts of yīfǎ zhìguó (依法治国: "governing the nation according to the rule of law") and jiànshè shèhuì zhǔyì fǎzhì guójiā (建设社会主义法制国家: "building a socialist rule of law state") have been part of the Chinese Communist Party's official policy since the mid-1990s. In 1999, the NPC adopted an amendment to the Chinese Constitution, incorporating both concepts in Article 5.

The existence of the rule of law in China has been widely debated. When discussing Chinese law, it is worth noting that various expressions have been used, including "strengthening the law," "tightening up the legal system," "abiding by the law in administration," "rule by law," and the "rule of law". Different shades of meanings have been attached to each of these terms, but Chinese officials and scholars have employed the expressions rather loosely and sometimes interchangeably. However, the central government had originally preferred the expression, "strengthening the law/legal system" to "the rule of law". It was thought that the latter might give a controversial connotation of the instrumentality, while the former conveyed a straightforward meaning of strengthening the law and institutions. "Strengthening the law" meant reform of legislation and enforcement of laws.
There are differing theories of the rule of law. One theory is the "thin", or formal, theory of rule of law, and the other is the "thick" theory.

The "thin" theory of rule of law is described by Randall Peerenboom as at the basest level incorporating a legal system that imposes meaningful restraints on the state and individuals in ruling power, that the law is supreme, and that all citizens are equal before the law. According to Lon Fuller’s account of thin theory, rule of law exists in a society when the laws of that society are "general, public, prospective, clear, consistent, capable of being followed, stable, and enforced". The thin theory has also been explained by Joseph Raz as emphasizing the formal or instrumental aspects of a legal system regardless of whether it is part of a particular political structure, i.e. a democratic or non-democratic society. Thick theory rule of law espouses all the elements of thin theory in addition imposes a political, social, and economic concept into the rule of law. The rule of law is regarded by some as presupposing political or economic structures of liberal democracy, human rights and other ideal socio-legal order. Some scholars believe that given China's socialist and non-democratic political system and practice, it is at best regarded as a country of rule by law with law used by the state as an instrument for social control. However, others rely on the formal or thin theory of rule of law to interpret fazhi as a legal reality in China. Additionally, some believe that China may still fall short of the thin theory of rule of law.

Of particular relevance to the second principle set out above, was the enactment of the Administrative Permission Law of the PRC (APL) on 27 August 2003, effective from July 2004. The APL for the first time requires all laws and regulations that subject any civil act to approval requirements to be published.

The APL also provides that only those laws adopted by the National People’s Congress or its Standing Committee, administrative regulations promulgated by the State Council, and local regulations adopted by the local people’s congresses may impose administrative approval requirements. Individual ministries or agencies (central or local) do not have such powers except in specified circumstances. This is consistent with the hierarchy of laws and regulations provided under the Legislative Law of the PRC. The enactment of the APL represents an encouraging step forward.

Despite the newly elevated role of courts in Chinese society, there still remains some consensus about defects in China’s legal system in regards to progressing towards the rule of law. Scholars point to the following defects as slowing movement toward rule of law. These include:
 First, the National People’s Congress is ineffective at executing its constitutional duty to legislate and supervise the government.
 Second, the Chinese Constitution is not treated as the supreme law, nor is it enforced.
 Third, the judiciary is not independent from political pressure. On the other hand, direct intervention in particular cases by the Chinese Communist Party has lessened in recent years, as has the direct influence of the party on the legislative process.
 Fourth, there is a high level of corruption among public officials. Personal favors, bribery, and taking of public monies are all too common at all levels of government.
 Finally, the legal profession is inadequate for lack of qualified attorneys and judges. This failure is being remedied by legislation aimed at instituting higher educational standards for judges, opening more courts and law schools throughout China.

In the 2000s, the Weiquan movement began in the PRC, seeking to advance citizens' rights partly by petitioning for enforcement of existing laws, and partly through activism. Lawyers in the movement have seen some court victories, but in other cases they are unsuccessful.

Lawyers in China have to swear an oath of loyalty to the Chinese Communist Party. Lawyers who refuse to follow the party line may have their license to practice law revoked.

See also
 Three Supremes

References

Citations

Sources 

 Deborah Cao, Chinese Law: A Language Perspective (Hants, England: Ashgate Publishing, 2004).
 Albert Hung-Yee Chen, An Introduction to the Legal System of the People's Republic of China (1992).
 Neil J. Diamant et al. (ed.), Engaging the Law in China: State, Society, and Possibilities for Justice (Stanford: Stanford University Press, 2005).
 Phillip C. C. Huang, Code, Custom and Legal Practice in China (Stanford: Stanford University Press, 2001).
 
 Xin Ren, Tradition of the Law and Law of the Tradition (Westport, Connecticut: Greenwood Press, 1997).
 Scott Andy, China Briefing Business Guide: Mergers and Acquisition Law in China (Kowloon, Hong Kong: Asia Briefing Media, 2007).

Further reading

External links 
 Ancient Chinese Theories of control (management study)
 Global-Regulation.com - Approximately 10,000 Chinese laws translated into English. Federal and state law, publicly available search engine.
 Judicial independence should come first China Daily/Beijing Review 2005-11-15 (article on Peking University legal scholar He Weifang)
 LexisNexis China. Commercial legal information provider.
 Official law portal for Chinese law. Maintained by the Legislative Affairs Office of the State Council
 Westlaw China. Commercial legal information provider.

 
Legal codes
Legal history